The Abor Formation   is located in the Siang district, Arunachal Pradesh, India. It is dated to the Permian. This formation consists of basalt, volcano-clastic breccia and rhyotaxitic dacite. This formation was named by the Abor Expedition of 1911-1912

References

Geologic formations of India